Rock Creek Center is an unincorporated community in Huntington County, Indiana, in the United States.

History
Rock Creek Center was so named from its position near the geographical center of Rock Creek Township. A post office called Rock Creek opened in 1874, and closed in 1902.

References

Unincorporated communities in Huntington County, Indiana
Unincorporated communities in Indiana